La Circe is an opera in three acts by Josef Mysliveček set to a libretto by Domenico Perelli that is based on Greek legends about the sorceress Circe. This opera (and all the rest of Mysliveček's operas) belong to the serious type in Italian language referred to as opera seria.

Performance history

The opera was first performed at the Teatro San Benedetto in Venice on 12 May 1779 to open the theater's unique Ascension operatic season. It was the last of the composer's three operas produced in Venice. No complete score survives from the production, only a few individual arias that found their way into aria collections.  The cast was distinguished, including as it did the great castrato Luigi Marchesi, one of the composer's close friends and professional associates, and the noted English soprano Cecilia Davies.

Roles

Vocal set pieces

Act I, scene 3 - Cavatina of Ulisse, "Spiegar non sò qual è" (Music lost) 
Act I, scene 4 - Aria of Prisco, "Ah, se per te del seno" (Music lost) 
Act I, scene 5 - Aria of Circe, "Ah, come mai resistere" 
Act I, scene 8 - Aria of Canente, "Sol quei che provano" (Music lost) 
Act I, scene 9 - Aria of Ulisse, "Saprai con tuo rossore" 
Act I, scene 11 - Aria of Sabino, "Pensa che sei Latino" (Music lost) 
Act I, scene 12 - Trio for Ulisse, Prisco, and Circe, "Senti bell'idol mio"

Act II, scene 1 - Aria of Clerinto, "Così talor se mira" (Music lost) 
Act II, scene 2 - Aria of Sabino, "Vado alla cara sposa" (Music lost) 
Act II, scene 3 - Aria of Prisco, "Di cento dubbi, e cento" (Music lost) 
Act II, scene 6 - Aria of Ulisse, "Idol mio, pietoso il fato" 
Act II, scene 9 - Aria of Canente, "È già sereno il cielo" (Music lost) 
Act II, scene 11 - Duet for Ulisse and Circe, "Non sia ver, bell'idol mio" (Music lost)

Act III, scene 3 - Aria of Ulissa, "Dille, costante" (Music lost) 
Act III, scene 4 - Aria of Sabino, "Nella crudele fiera tempesta" (Music lost) 
Act III, scene 6 - Aria of Prisco, "Già i venti tacciono" (Music lost) 
Act III, scene 10 - Aria of Circe, "D'un alma abbandonata" (Music lost) 
Act III, scene 11 - Quartet for Circe, Prisco, Sabino, and Canente, "Alme amante, se sperate" (Music lost)

References
Freeman, Daniel E.  Josef Mysliveček, "Il Boemo."  Sterling Heights, Mich.: Harmonie Park Press, 2009.

Italian-language operas
Operas by Josef Mysliveček
1779 operas
Opera seria
Operas
Operas based on classical mythology
Circe